= Pryssgården =

Borough in Sweden

Coordinates: 58°36′13.26″N 16°7′59.7″E

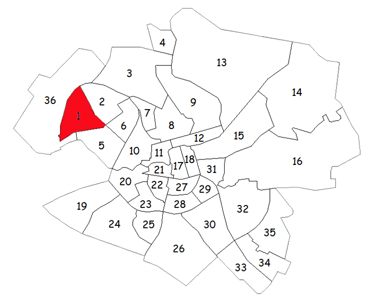
Pryssgården highlighted in red

Pryssgården is a borough in Norrköping, Sweden.
